Todo a Su Tiempo is the debut album by Divino. It contains many hits such as Se Activaron Los Anormales, Super Gangsteril, Te vas, Tres perros, and Una lágrima.

Track listing

Platinum edition

Divino albums
2004 albums
2006 albums
Albums produced by Luny Tunes
Albums produced by Noriega
Albums produced by Nely